James Peter Sutton (born 6 September 1949) is a Scottish former professional footballer who played in the Football League for Mansfield Town.

References

1949 births
Living people
Scottish footballers
Association football midfielders
English Football League players
St Roch's F.C. players
Newcastle United F.C. players
Mansfield Town F.C. players
Morecambe F.C. players